Christopher Pierre Janson (born April 2, 1986) is an American country music singer and songwriter. Janson has recorded three full-length albums, Buy Me a Boat, Everybody, and Real Friends, through Warner Records Nashville, along with one extended play each for Bigger Picture Music Group, Columbia Records, and Warner Nashville. He has charted multiple singles on the Billboard Hot Country Songs and Country Airplay charts, including "Good Vibes" and "Done", both of which went to number one on the latter. In addition to his material, Janson has performed on albums by Holly Williams and Lee Brice and has co-written singles for Tim McGraw, LoCash, Randy Houser and Hank Williams Jr.

Musical career
Christopher Pierre Janson was born on April 2, 1986, in Perryville, Missouri. He moved to Nashville, Tennessee, after finishing high school.

In June 2009, Janson co-wrote and recorded two duets with Holly Williams on her album Here with Me: "I Hold On" and "A Love I Think Will Last." Janson signed to BNA Records in October 2009 and released his debut single, "'Til a Woman Comes Along," in April 2010. Matt Bjorke of Roughstock gave the single a five-star rating, with his review praising Janson's vocals as well as the arrangement. The song debuted at No. 56 on the Billboard Hot Country Songs charts dated for the week ending May 1, 2010.

After BNA was restructured, Janson left the label. He co-wrote Tim McGraw's 2012 single "Truck Yeah," played harmonica on the track "Beer" from Lee Brice's album Hard 2 Love, and wrote the title track to Justin Moore's 2013 album Off the Beaten Path.

In 2013, he signed to Bigger Picture Music Group and released "Better I Don't." Janson wrote the song with his wife, Kelly, and Pat Bunch, and Keith Stegall produced it. "Better I Don't" peaked at number 40 on Country Airplay in mid-2013. A second single, "Cut Me Some Slack," peaked at number 60 before Bigger Picture closed in 2014. That same year, Columbia Records released Take It to the Bank, which included "Til a Woman Comes Along" and other songs that he had recorded while on BNA.

Janson self-released the single "Buy Me a Boat" in early 2015. The song debuted at No. 33 on Hot Country Songs after it received airplay on the Bobby Bones Show. It was officially released as a single via Warner Records Nashville in May 2015, and became Janson's first top-5 hit by August. In September, Janson announced that his debut studio album (also titled Buy Me a Boat)  would be released on October 30. "Buy Me a Boat" peaked at No. 3 on Country Airplay and No. 1 on Mediabase. The album also includes the singles "Power of Positive Drinkin'" and "Holdin' Her". Also, in 2015, Janson co-wrote LoCash's "I Love This Life." Also, in 2016, Janson co-wrote Randy Houser's "Song Number 7."

Janson performed on the third day of the 2016 Republican National Convention.

Janson's second album for Warner Nashville, Everybody, was released in September 2017. Its lead single is "Fix a Drink", which was followed in 2018 by "Drunk Girl". His next album was 2019's Real Friends, which accounted for the number-one singles "Good Vibes" and "Done". Jansons All In, was his fourth and final album with Warner before starting his own imprint "Harpeth 60 Records" with BMLG Records in 2022.

Musical stylings
Fusing old and new country styles, Chris Janson’s diverse music style has earned him the title of the “future of country music” from both critics and country music’s biggest stars.

Personal life
Chris Janson has been married to Kelly Lynn since 2010. They have four children, two of whom are from Lynn's previous marriage.

Discography

Studio albums

Extended plays

Singles

Other charted songs

Music videos

Notes

References

External links
 Official Website

1986 births
American country harmonica players
American country singer-songwriters
American male singer-songwriters
Big Machine Records artists
BNA Records artists
Columbia Records artists
Living people
Country musicians from Missouri
Bigger Picture Music Group artists
Warner Records artists
People from Perryville, Missouri
Singer-songwriters from Missouri
21st-century American singers
21st-century American male singers